The Lewis Katz School of Medicine at Temple University (LKSOM), located on the Health Science Campus of Temple University in Philadelphia, PA, is one of 7 schools of medicine in Pennsylvania conferring the M.D. (Doctor of Medicine) degree. It also confers the Ph.D. (Doctor of Philosophy) and M.S. (Master of Science) degrees in biomedical sciences. In addition, LKSOM offers a Narrative Medicine Program.

In July 2014, Lewis Katz School of Medicine's scientists became the first to remove HIV from human cells. Temple University's Fox Chase Cancer Center is ranked 9th best Hospital for Adult Cancer by U.S. News & World Report.
LKSOM reported 15,624 applications in 2020 (class of 2024) for a class size of 210 students; 340 of the total 9,624 applications received acceptance, translating to a 1.3% acceptance rate.

History 
Founded in 1901 as Pennsylvania's first co-educational medical school, the institution has attained a national reputation for training humanistic and dedicated clinicians. The school was founded with the central principle that quality education should be afforded to everyone regardless of their ability to pay. In addition, the school has emphasized the development of humanitarianism; a value highlighted by Sir William Osler's quote, "The good physician treats the disease; the great physician treats the patient who has the disease." This quote is inscribed on one of the walls in the Medical Education and Research Building.

Revitalization and reconstruction
Under the leadership of Dean John Daly, M.D., alumnus of the class of 1973, LKSOM underwent revitalization.  The institution hired 262 new professors in 4 years; added clinical and basic science departments;  and completely revamped the medical curriculum to meet changing educational paradigms.

Additionally, on November 1, 2007, LKSOM broke ground on a new home. At a projected cost of $160 million, the project is the largest capital improvement project in the history of Temple University.  The new building, an 11-story, glass and brick structure designed by Philadelphia-based architecture and engineering firm Ballinger, opened in May 2009. Notable features include: a modern anatomy laboratory with computers and high definition LCD screens on articulating arms; a fully interactive patient simulation center with simulated doctor offices, emergency medicine department, and surgical apparatuses as well as a staff of simulated patient actors, simulated patient mannequins, and full-time instructing physicians; and a 24-hour, 50,000 sq. foot library with individualized study rooms containing high definition televisions with multimedia and wireless accessibility.

The new medical education building also features a wide array of attributes designed to lower stress of its faculty, staff, and students. Examples include: a classical grand piano on the third floor; a medical student lounge with cable, high definition television; and a three-story atrium/commons area containing armchairs and medical art.

Educational Programs 
 MD Program
 PhD/MS in Biomedical Sciences
 MA in Urban Bioethics
 MD/PhD 
 MD/MA in Urban Bioethics 
 MD/MPH 
 MD/MBA 
Narrative Medicine Program
On December 7, 2019, LKSOM hosted its first inaugural Narrative Medicine Conference. The conference featured presentations on Theater of Witness by Megan Voeller (Tangles in Time), photography by Dr. John Hansen-Flaschen, and a life of narratives in medicine by Dr. Amy Goldberg and Dr. Steven Rosenberg. Workshops included reflective writing, poetry, dance, photography, drawing, improv theater, fiction writing and reimagining the patient chart. 
 Physician Assistant Program
 Postbaccalaureate Program

Medical curriculum 
The education of medical students at Temple University School of Medicine includes a foundation in the fundamentals of basic and clinical science. The first two years are taught in an integrated approach, closely tying basic science concepts to clinical medicine, professionalism and medical ethics. The clinical years are marked by hands-on experience in caring for patients. The William Maul Measey Institute for Clinical Simulation and Patient Safety allows students to learn basic clinical skills and teamwork in a safe learning environment throughout the curriculum.

Year 1 
The major goal of Year 1 is normal structure, function and development. The year is divided into six blocks:
Human Gross Anatomy
Elements of Bioscience
Body Systems 1
Body Systems 2
Body Systems 3
Basic Principles of Immunology, Pathology and Pharmacology studies

A doctoring course running throughout the curriculum enables students to learn the basics of history-taking, physical exam skills and professionalism. The course uses clinical cases to integrate the teaching and evaluation of clinical skills with the basic science concepts in each of the blocks, and utilizes the William Maul Measey Institute for Clinical Simulation and Patient Safety to aid learning through interactive clinical scenarios. Faculty preceptors provide individualized mentoring and career advising.

Year 2 
Year 2 focuses on the causes, mechanisms, identification and treatment of major human diseases. The second year is divided into 5 blocks:
Microbiology and Infectious Diseases
Diseases of the Cardiovascular and Respiratory Systems
Diseases of the Renal, Endocrine and Reproductive Systems
Diseases of the Central Nervous and Musculoskeletal Systems
Diseases of the Gastrointestinal System, Hematology and Oncology

The Doctoring 2 course enables students to practice and improve their clinical skills and professionalism through closely supervised rotations in both ambulatory and hospital settings.

Year 3 
During Year 3, beginning in mid-May of the second year, students rotate through core clerkships in:
Family Medicine
Internal Medicine
Neurology
Obstetrics and Gynecology
Pediatrics
Psychiatry
Surgery
Elective (clinical, research or academic)

The third year Doctoring course emphasizes career advising, evidence-based medicine, professionalism and clinical decision-making.

Year 4 
In Year 4, beginning in May of the third year, students focus on areas of interest through a large variety of electives. They are required to do a sub-internship in either pediatrics, surgery, or medicine, as well as rotations in an intensive-care unit, the emergency department, and radiology. The balance of the fourth year is given over to electives, research, and residency interviews. Available electives include multiple medical and surgical sub-specialties. Students interested in specialties like obstetrics or neurology may also elect to do a second sub-internship in these specialties.

Clinical campuses 
Temple offers opportunities to perform third and fourth year rotations at a number of Pennsylvania-based clinical campuses.
 Temple University Health System, Philadelphia (including: Temple University Hospital (TUH), TUH Episcopal Division, and Jeanes Hospital)
 Abington Memorial Hospital, Abington
 Conemaugh Memorial Medical Center, Johnstown
 Crozer-Chester Medical Center, Upland
 Fox Chase Cancer Center, Philadelphia
 Geisinger Medical Center, Danville
 Lehigh Valley Hospital–Cedar Crest, Allentown
 Mercy Hospital, Scranton
 Reading Hospital and Medical Center, Reading
 St. Christopher's Hospital for Children, Philadelphia
 St. Luke's Hospital, Bethlehem
 Allegheny Health Network, Pittsburgh

Branch campuses 

In response to the increasing demand for dedicated U.S. and Pennsylvania physicians, Temple University School of Medicine established branch campuses in various Pennsylvania locations. These regional campuses provide the same basic science courses offered at the main Philadelphia campus, however will be based in separate cities. The first of these branch campuses was established at St. Luke's Hospital, Bethlehem, Pennsylvania and opened in the Fall 2011 with an inaugural class of 30.

Plans were in place to open a branch campus at Allegheny Health Network (formerly West Penn Allegheny Health System) in Pittsburgh, Pennsylvania in June 2011 which already serves as a site for clinical rotations for Temple University School of Medicine Since then, no further development in the establishment of the branch campus has been made.

Notable alumni and pioneers
The school has been home to a number of renowned alumni and faculty, including:
 W. Wayne Babcock M.D., inventor of the Babcock surgical forceps
 Catherine L. Bacon, a leading expert in psychosomatic medicine
 Harry E. Bacon, the first editor of the SKULL yearbook and Head of Division of Colorectal Surgery
 W. Emory Burnett, an outstanding worker in thoracic and vascular surgery, performed the first human pneumonectomy in Philadelphia 
 W. Edward Chamberlain, a radiologist who developed contrast and cine radiological techniques with Temple associates. Their image intensifier in fluoroscopy made possible movie films, television viewing and three-dimensional effects in x-ray diagnosis.
 Agnes Barr Chase, an accomplished artist and illustrator, she collaborated with her husband, Dr. Theodore L. Chase, in compiling an atlas of surgery.
 Angelo DiGeorge M.D., a pediatrician who first described DiGeorge Syndrome as a practitioner at LKSOM
 Thomas Durant MD, a notable contributor in specialties of electrocardiography, contrast visualization, and the dynamics of circulation and respiration.  Dr. Durant also served as the Chair of the American Board of Internal Medicine and President of the American Federation for Clinical Research during his career.
 O. Spurgeon English, a renowned psychiatrist who, with Dr. Edward Weiss at Temple, wrote a signal volume on psychosomatic medicine. A distinguished teacher and psychotherapist, he established clinics in child, adult and family mental health.
 Temple S. Fay, a neurosurgeon who introduced the use of hypothermia in medical and surgical illnesses. He also developed rehabilitation procedures based upon analysis of phylogenetic movements.
 Edward Goljan M.D., a well known physician among medical students for his development of medical licensing exam study materials.
 Harriet L. Hartley, Professor of Hygiene and Public Health for 20 years (1924–44). She made major contributions to maternal and child health and environmental sanitation.
 Marvin Haskin, physician, professor, medical author, editor, and researcher
 John Franklin Huber an eminent anatomist, distinguished for his delineation of the bronchopulmonary segments
 Chevalier Jackson M.D., pioneer in the field of otolaryngology
 Richard A. Kern, a pioneer allergist, medical leader, and statesman. As an expert in military and tropical medicine, he served as Chair of the Department of Medicine, and was a Trustee of Temple University and President of the American College of Physicians.
 John A. Kolmer, a national leader in preventive medicine and public health, achieved wide recognition by his research in immunology, serodiagnosis and chemotherapy.
 Frank H. Krusen, originator of the field of physical medicine, establishing the first such department in the US at Temple University Hospital (1929). He moved to the Mayo Clinic in 1935 and later returned to Temple, whose rehabilitation center bears his name.
 John Lachman, late Chairman of the Department of Orthopaedic Surgery and Sports Medicine at Temple who developed the reliable clinical test used to diagnose injury of the anterior cruciate ligament (ACL), which bears his name.
 Dawn B. Marks PhD, developer of innovative teaching techniques in biochemistry and molecular biology; grounding concepts in practical applications in clinical medicine. Her text, Review of Biochemistry (1990), has been translated into five languages and became the basis for a USMLE biochemistry board review book universally referenced by medical students preparing for the boards.  She also wrote Basic Medical Biochemistry: A Clinical Approach (1996), and developed computer-based teaching programs.  She was honored with numerous teaching awards throughout her career.
 John Royal Moore, orthopedic surgeon, originated a technique of delayed reduction of fractures and gained wide recognition as both a practitioner and a teacher.
 Harris M. Nagler, MD, FACS., Physician-in-Chief and Chief Medical Officer for Mount Sinai Beth Israel Health System in Manhattan, and Senior Associate Dean for Clinical Affairs of the Mount Sinai Health System and Icahn School of Medicine at Mount Sinai
 Waldo Nelson M.D., editor of the Nelson's Textbook of Pediatrics
 Hugo Roesler, a Vienna-trained cardiologist/electrocardiographer and author of one of the earliest books on cardiovascular imaging (1937).
 David Ruhe, former member of the Universal House of Justice, the supreme governing body of the Baháʼí Faith.
 Machteld Elisabeth Sano, a Belgian-trained clinical pathologist known for her research on tissue culture and use of fibrin glue for skin grafting.
 Sol Sherry MD, revolutionized the treatment of acute MI through his pioneering work in thrombolytic therapy and trained many of today's leaders in the field of thrombosis and hemostasis. Dr. Sherry founded the Council on Thrombosis of the American Heart Association, International Council of Osmosis, and the International Society of Thrombosis and Haemostasis.
 Ernest A. Spiegel a neurologist who, together with Dr. Henry T. Wycis and others, devised stereoencephalotomy with stereotactic procedures for control of pain, tremor, and convulsive disorders.
 Shirley Tilghman Ph.D., an alumnus of the School's biochemistry department and first female president of Princeton University
 Sidney Weinhouse headed the Fels Research Institute of Temple University and Cancer Research. Noted for investigations of biochemical mechanisms and properties of cancer cells, he was elected to the National Academy of Sciences.
 Joseph Wolpe M.D., psychiatrist and father of behavioral modification therapy
 Bernard T. Mittemeyer M.D., former Surgeon General of the United States Army
 John E. Fryer M.D., famed psychiatrist and gay rights activist

See also
Temple University Hospital
Temple University
Medical schools in Pennsylvania

Notes

References
Temple University School of Medicine
Biography of Joseph Wolpe, MD
Biography of Shirley Tilghman, PhD
Best Medical Schools: Research
Best Medical Schools: Primary Care

Medical schools in Pennsylvania
Temple University
Educational institutions established in 1901
Nicetown-Tioga, Philadelphia
1901 establishments in Pennsylvania